The 1986 Camden Council election took place on 8 May 1986 to elect members of Camden London Borough Council in London, England.  The whole council was up for election.

Labour made big gains from the Conservatives across the borough: gaining Bloomsbury and one seat in Brunswick in the south, South End and the two remaining Highgate seats in the north-east, and Swiss Cottage in the north-west.  The SDP–Liberal Alliance also won Fortune Green from the Conservatives.

Election result

|}

Ward results

Adelaide

Belsize

Bloomsbury

Brunswick

Camden

Castlehaven

Caversham

Chalk Farm

Fitzjohns

Fortune Green

Frognal

Gospel Oak

Grafton

Hampstead Town

Highgate

Holborn

Kilburn

King's Cross

Priory

Regent's Park

St John's

St Pancras

Somers Town

South End

Swiss Cottage

West End

References

 

1986
1986 London Borough council elections